This is an alphabetical list of astronauts, people selected to train for a human spaceflight program to command, pilot, or serve as a crew member of a spacecraft.

For a list of everyone who has flown in space, see List of space travelers by name.

More than 600 people have been trained as astronauts. Until recently, astronauts were sponsored and trained exclusively by governments, either by the military or by civilian space agencies. However, with the advent of suborbital flight starting with privately funded SpaceShipOne in 2004, a new category of astronaut was created: the commercial astronaut.

While the term astronaut is sometimes applied to anyone who trains for travel into space—including scientists, politicians, journalists, and tourists—this article lists only professional astronauts, those who have been selected to train professionally. This includes national space programs, industry and commercial space programs which train and/or hire their own professional astronauts.

The flags indicate the astronaut's primary citizenship during his or her time as an astronaut. The symbol  identifies female astronauts. The symbol △ indicates astronauts who have left low Earth orbit. The symbol ▲ indicates astronauts who have walked on the Moon. The symbol † indicates astronauts who have died in incidents related to a space program. 

A
 Joseph M. Acaba (1967–) — STS-119, Soyuz TMA-04M, Soyuz MS-06
 Loren Acton (1936–) — STS-51-F
 Mike Adams (1930–1967) † — Died in the X-15 Flight 191 break up.
 James Adamson (1946–) — STS-28, STS-43
  Viktor M. Afanasyev — Soyuz TM-11, Soyuz TM-18, Soyuz TM-29, Soyuz TM-33/32
 Aydyn Aimbetov — Soyuz TMA-18M
 Thomas Akers — STS-41, STS-49, STS-61, STS-79

 Vladimir Aksyonov — Soyuz 22, Soyuz T-2
 Buzz Aldrin △▲ — Gemini 12, Apollo 11. Second person to walk on the Moon.
 Aleksandar Panayotov Aleksandrov — Soyuz TM-5
 Aleksandr Pavlovich Aleksandrov — Soyuz T-9, Soyuz TM-3
 Andrew M. Allen — STS-46, STS-62, STS-75
 Joseph P. Allen — STS-5, STS-51-A
 Michael Alsbury † — Commercial astronaut, died in the VSSEnterprise test flight PF04 crash
 Christopher Altman — NASA-trained Commercial astronaut, Association of Spaceflight Professionals 2011
 Scott Altman — STS-90, STS-106, STS-109, STS-125
 William Anders △ — Apollo 8
 Clayton Anderson — STS-117/120, STS-131
 Michael P. Anderson, (1959–2003) † — STS-89. Died in the Columbia reentry disintegration (STS-107).

(Claudie André-Deshays – see Claudie Haigneré)
 Dominic A. Antonelli — STS-119, STS-132
 Jerome Apt — STS-37, STS-47, STS-59, STS-79
 Lee Archambault — STS-117, STS-119
 Neil Armstrong (1930–2012) △▲ — Gemini 8, Apollo 11. First person to walk on the Moon.
 Oleg Artemyev — Soyuz TMA-12M, Soyuz MS-08, Soyuz MS-21
 Richard R. Arnold — STS-119, Soyuz MS-08
 Anatoly Artsebarsky — Soyuz TM-12
 Yuri Artyukhin (1930–1998) — Soyuz 14
 Jeffrey Ashby — STS-93, STS-100, STS-112
 Oleg Atkov — Soyuz T-10/11
 Toktar Aubakirov — Soyuz TM-13/12
 Serena M. Auñón-Chancellor — Soyuz MS-09, Expedition 56/57
 Sergei Avdeyev — Soyuz TM-15, Soyuz TM-22

B
 James P. Bagian, M.D. — STS-29, STS-40
 Ellen S. Baker, M.D. — STS-34, STS-50, STS-71
 Michael Baker — STS-43, STS-52, STS-68, STS-81
 Aleksandr Balandin — Soyuz TM-9
 Michael R. Barratt, M.D. — Soyuz TMA-14, STS-133
 Kayla Barron— SpaceX Crew-3
 Daniel Barry — STS-72, STS-96, STS-105
 John-David F. Bartoe — STS-51-F
 Charlie Bassett (1931–1966) — No flights. Originally assigned to Gemini 9.
 Yuri Baturin — Soyuz TM-28/27, Soyuz TM-32/31
 Patrick Baudry — STS-51-G
 Alan Bean (1932–2018) △▲ — Apollo 12, Skylab 3
 Robert L. Behnken — STS-123, STS-130, Crew Dragon Demo-2
 Ivan Bella — Soyuz TM-29/28
 Pavel Belyayev (1925–1970) — Voskhod 2
 Georgi Beregovoi (1921–1995) — Soyuz 3
 Anatoli Berezovoy (1942–2014) — Soyuz T-5/7
 Brian Binnie — SpaceShipOne flight 17P
 John Blaha — STS-29, STS-33, STS-43, STS-58, STS-79/81
 Michael J. Bloomfield — STS-86, STS-97, STS-110
 Guion Bluford — STS-8, STS-61-A, STS-39, STS-53
 Karol Bobko — STS-6, STS-51-D, STS-51-J
 Eric A. Boe — STS-126, STS-133
 Charles Bolden — STS-61-C, STS-31, STS-45, STS-60
 Roberta Bondar, M.D. — STS-42
 Valentin Bondarenko (1937–1961) † — No flights. Died from a training-related fire accident.
 Andrei Borisenko — Soyuz TMA-21, Soyuz MS-02
 Frank Borman △ — Gemini 7, Apollo 8
 Stephen G. Bowen — STS-126, STS-132, STS-133, SpaceX Crew-6
 Kenneth Bowersox — STS-50, STS-61, STS-73, STS-82, STS-113/Soyuz TMA-1
 Charles E. Brady, Jr., M.D. (1951–2006) — STS-78
 Vance Brand — Apollo-Soyuz Test Project, STS-5, STS-41-B, STS-35
 Daniel Brandenstein — STS-8, STS-51-G, STS-32, STS-49
 Randolph Bresnik — STS-129
 Roy Bridges — STS-51-F
 Curtis Brown — STS-47, STS-66, STS-77, STS-85, STS-95, STS-103
 David M. Brown (1956–2003) † — Died in the Columbia reentry disintegration (STS-107)
 Mark Brown — STS-28, STS-48
 James Buchli — STS-51-C, STS-61-A, STS-29, STS-48
 Jay C. Buckey, M.D. — STS-90
 Nikolai Budarin — STS-71/Soyuz TM-21, Soyuz TM-27, STS-113/Soyuz TMA-1
 John S. Bull (1934–2008) — No flights.
 Daniel Burbank — STS-106, STS-115, Soyuz TMA-22
 Daniel Bursch — STS-51, STS-68, STS-77, STS-108/111
 Valery Bykovsky — Vostok 5, Soyuz 22, Soyuz 31/29

C
 🇺🇸 Coby Cotton-New Shepard-2022-23
 Robert D. Cabana — STS-41, STS-53, STS-65, STS-88
 Yvonne Cagle, M.D. — No flights.
 Cai Xuzhe — Shenzhou 14
 Fernando Caldeiro (1958–2009) — No flights.
 Charles Camarda — STS-114
 Kenneth D. Cameron — STS-37, STS-56, STS-74
 Zena Cardman — No flights.
 Duane G. Carey — STS-109
 Scott Carpenter (1925–2013) — Mercury 7
 Gerald Carr (1932-2020) — Skylab 4
 Sonny Carter, M.D. (1947–1991) — STS-33
 John Casper — STS-36, STS-54, STS-62, STS-77
 Josh Cassada — SpaceX Crew-5
 Christopher Cassidy — STS-127 Soyuz MS-16
 Robert J. Cenker — STS-61-C
 Eugene Cernan (1934–2017) △▲ — Gemini 9A, Apollo 10, Apollo 17
 Roger B. Chaffee (1935–1967) † — Died in the Apollo 1 fire accident.
 Gregory Chamitoff — STS-124/126, STS-134
  Franklin Chang-Diaz — STS-61-C, STS-34, STS-46, STS-60, STS-75, STS-91, STS-111
  Philip K. Chapman — No flights.
 Raja Chari — SpaceX Crew-3
  Kalpana Chawla (1961–2003) † — STS-87. Died in the Columbia reentry disintegration (STS-107).
 Maurizio Cheli — STS-75
 Chen Dong — Shenzhou 11, Shenzhou 14.
 Chen Quan — No flights. Backup for Shenzhou 7.
 Leroy Chiao — STS-65, STS-72, STS-92, Soyuz TMA-5
 Kevin P. Chilton — STS-49, STS-59, STS-76
 Jean-Loup Chrétien — Soyuz T-6, Soyuz TM-7/6, STS-86
 Laurel B. Clark, M.D. (1961–2003) † — Died in the Columbia reentry disintegration (STS-107)
 Mary L. Cleave — STS-61-B, STS-30
 Jean-François Clervoy, EAC — STS-66, STS-84, STS-103
 Michael R. Clifford — STS-53, STS-59, STS-76
 Michael Coats — STS-41-D, STS-29, STS-39
 Kenneth Cockrell — STS-56, STS-69, STS-80, STS-98, STS-111
 Catherine Coleman  — STS-73, STS-93, Soyuz TMA-20
 Eileen Collins — STS-63, STS-84, STS-93, STS-114
 Michael Collins (1930-2021) △ — Gemini 10, Apollo 11
 Charles "Pete" Conrad (1930–1999) △▲ — Gemini 5, Gemini 11, Apollo 12, Skylab 2
 Gordon Cooper (1927–2004) — Mercury 9, Gemini 5
 Richard O. Covey — STS-51-I, STS-26, STS-38, STS-61
 Timothy Creamer — Soyuz TMA-17
 John O. Creighton — STS-51-G, STS-36, STS-48
 Robert Crippen — STS-1, STS-7, STS-41-C, STS-41-G
 Samantha Cristoforetti — Soyuz TMA-15M, SpaceX Crew-4 (2022)
 Roger K. Crouch — STS-83, STS-94
 Frank L. Culbertson, Jr. — STS-38, STS-51, STS-105/108
 Walter Cunningham — Apollo 7
 Robert Curbeam — STS-85, STS-98, STS-116
 Nancy J. Currie — STS-57, STS-70, STS-88, STS-109

D
 Bill Dana — X-15 flights 174 and 197
 Nancy Jan Davis — STS-47, STS-60, STS-85
 Lawrence J. DeLucas — STS-50
 Frank De Winne — Soyuz TMA-1/TM-34, Soyuz TMA-15
 Deng Qingming — Shenzhou 15
 Vladimir N. Dezhurov — Soyuz TM-21/STS-71
 Georgi Dobrovolski (1928–1971) † — Died in the Soyuz 11 reentry depressurisation
 Takao Doi — STS-87, STS-123
 Matthew Dominick — No flights
 B. Alvin Drew — STS-118, STS-133
 Pyotr Dubrov — Soyuz MS-18,  Soyuz MS-19
 Brian Duffy — STS-45, STS-57, STS-72, STS-92
 Charles Duke △▲ — Apollo 16
 Bonnie J. Dunbar — STS-61-A, STS-32, STS-50, STS-71, STS-89
 Pedro Duque — STS-95, Soyuz TMA-3/2
 Samuel T. Durrance — STS-35, STS-67
 James Dutton — STS-131
 Lev Dyomin (1926–1998) — Soyuz 15
 Tracy Caldwell Dyson — STS-118, Soyuz TMA-18
 Vladimir Dzhanibekov — Soyuz 27/26, Soyuz 39, Soyuz T-6, Soyuz T-12, Soyuz T-13

E
 Joe Edwards — STS-89
 Donn F. Eisele (1930–1987) — Apollo 7
 Anthony W. England — STS-51-F
 Joe H. Engle — X-15 flights 138, 143, and 153, STS-2, STS-51-I
 Jeanette J. Epps — No flights
 Ronald Evans (1933–1990) △ — Apollo 17
 Reinhold Ewald — Soyuz TM-25/24
 Léopold Eyharts, EAC — Soyuz TM-27/26, STS-122/123

F
 John Fabian — STS-7, STS-51-G
 Muhammed Faris — Soyuz TM-3/2
 Bertalan Farkas — Soyuz 36/35
 Jean-Jacques Favier — STS-78
 Andrey Fedyaev — SpaceX Crew-6
 Fei Junlong — Shenzhou 6, Shenzhou 15
 Konstantin Feoktistov (1926–2009) — Voskhod 1
 Christopher Ferguson — STS-115, STS-126, STS-135
 Martin J. Fettman — STS-58
 Andrew J. Feustel — STS-125, STS-134, Soyuz MS-08
 Anatoly Filipchenko — Soyuz 7, Soyuz 16
 Michael Fincke — Soyuz TMA-4, Soyuz TMA-13, STS-134
 John L. Finley (1935–2006) — No flights. Trained for the MOL program.
 Jack D. Fischer — Soyuz MS-04
 Anna Lee Fisher, M.D. — STS-51-A
 William Frederick Fisher, M.D. — STS-51-I
 Klaus-Dietrich Flade — Soyuz TM-14/13
  Michael Foale — STS-45, STS-56, STS-63, STS-84/86, STS-103, Soyuz TMA-3
 Kevin A. Ford — STS-128, Soyuz TMA-06M
 Michael Foreman — STS-123, STS-129
 Patrick Forrester — STS-105, STS-117, STS-128
 Michael Fossum — STS-121, STS-124, Soyuz TMA-02M
 Ted Freeman (1930–1964) — No flights
 Stephen Frick — STS-110, STS-122
 Dirk Frimout — STS-45
 Christer Fuglesang — STS-116, STS-128
 Gordon Fullerton (1936–2013) — STS-3, STS-51-F
 Wally Funk — Blue Origin NS-16
 Reinhard Furrer (1940–1995) — STS-61-A
 Satoshi Furukawa — Soyuz TMA-02M, SpaceX Crew-7

G
 F. Drew Gaffney, M.D. — STS-40
 Yuri Gagarin (1934–1968)† — Vostok 1. First person in space.Died in a training flight. 
 Ronald Garan — STS-124, Soyuz TMA-21
 Dale Gardner (1948–2014) — STS-8, STS-51-A
 Guy Gardner — STS-27, STS-35
 Marc Garneau — STS-41-G, STS-77, STS-97
 Owen Garriott (1930–2019) — Skylab 3, STS-9
 Charles Gemar — STS-38, STS-48, STS-62
 Michael Gernhardt — STS-69, STS-83, STS-94, STS-104
 Alexander Gerst — Soyuz TMA-13M
 Edward Gibson — Skylab 4
 Robert L. Gibson — STS-41-B, STS-61-C, STS-27, STS-47, STS-71
 Yuri Gidzenko — Soyuz TM-22, Soyuz TM-31/STS-102, Soyuz TM-34/Soyuz TM-33
 Ed Givens (1930–1967) — No flights. NASA group 5.
 Yuri Glazkov (1939–2008) — Soyuz 24
 John Glenn (1921–2016) — Mercury 6, STS-95
 Victor Glover — SpaceX Crew-1
 Linda Godwin — STS-37, STS-59, STS-76, STS-108
 Michael T. Good — STS-125, STS-132
 Viktor Gorbatko — Soyuz 7, Soyuz 24, Soyuz 37/36
 Richard Gordon (1929–2017) △ — Gemini 11, Apollo 12
 Dominic Gorie — STS-91, STS-99, STS-108, STS-123
 Ronald Grabe — STS-51-J, STS-30, STS-42, STS-57
 Duane Graveline, M.D. (1931–2016) — No flights
 Georgi Grechko (1931–2017) — Soyuz 17, Soyuz 26/27, Soyuz T-14/13
 Frederick Gregory — STS-51-B, STS-33, STS-44
 William Gregory — STS-67
 David Griggs (1939–1989) — STS-51-D
 Virgil I. "Gus" Grissom (1926–1967) † — Mercury-Redstone 4, Gemini 3. Died in the Apollo 1 fire accident.
 John Grunsfeld — STS-67, STS-81, STS-103, STS-109, STS-125
 Aleksei Gubarev — Soyuz 17, Soyuz 28
 Umberto Guidoni — STS-75, STS-100
 Jügderdemidiin Gürragchaa — Soyuz 39
 Sidney Gutierrez — STS-40, STS-59

H
 Chris Hadfield — STS-74, STS-100, Expedition 34, Expedition 35, Soyuz TMA-07M
 Nick Hague — Soyuz MS-10, Soyuz MS-12 
 Claudie Haigneré, EAC — Soyuz TM-24/23, Soyuz TM-33/32
 Jean-Pierre Haigneré, EAC — Soyuz TM-17/16, Soyuz TM-29
 Fred Haise △ — Apollo 13
 James Halsell — STS-65, STS-74, STS-83, STS-94, STS-101
 Kenneth Ham — STS-124, STS-132
 Christina Hammock Koch — Soyuz MS-12/Soyuz MS-13 (Expedition 59/60/61). A member of the first all-female EVA team.
 Lloyd Hammond — STS-39, STS-64
 Jeremy Hansen — No flights
 Gregory Harbaugh — STS-39, STS-54, STS-71, STS-82
 Bernard A. Harris, Jr. — STS-55, STS-63
 Terry Hart — STS-41-C
 Henry Hartsfield (1933–2014) — STS-4, STS-41-D, STS-61-A
 Frederick Hauck — STS-7, STS-51-A, STS-26
 Steven Hawley — STS-41-D, STS-61-C, STS-31, STS-82, STS-93
 Susan Helms — STS-54, STS-64, STS-78, STS-101, STS-102/105
 Karl Henize (1926–1993) — STS-51-F
 Thomas Hennen — STS-44
 Terence Henricks — STS-44, STS-55, STS-70, STS-78
 Mirosław Hermaszewski — Soyuz 30
 José M. Hernández — STS-128
 John Herrington — STS-113
 Richard Hieb — STS-39, STS-49, STS-65
 Joan Higginbotham — STS-116
 David Hilmers — STS-51-J, STS-26, STS-36, STS-42
 Robert Hines — SpaceX Crew-4 (2022)
 Kathryn Hire — STS-90, STS-130
 Charles Hobaugh — STS-104, STS-118, STS-129
 Warren Hoburg — SpaceX Crew-6
 Jeffrey Hoffman — STS-51-D, STS-35, STS-46, STS-61, STS-75
 Donald Holmquest, M.D. — No flights
 Michael S. Hopkins — Soyuz TMA-10M, SpaceX Crew-1
 Scott Horowitz — STS-75, STS-82, STS-101, STS-105
 Akihiko Hoshide — STS-124, Soyuz TMA-05M, SpaceX Crew-2
 Millie Hughes-Fulford — STS-40
 Douglas G. Hurley — STS-127, STS-135, Crew Dragon Demo-2
 Rick Husband (1957–2003) † — STS-96. Died in the Columbia reentry disintegration (STS-107).

I
 James Irwin (1930-1991) △▲ — Apollo 15
 Aleksandr Ivanchenkov — Soyuz 29/31
 Anatoli Ivanishin — Soyuz TMA-22 Soyuz MS-16
 Georgi Ivanov — Soyuz 33
 Marsha Ivins — STS-32, STS-46, STS-62, STS-81, STS-98

J
  Sigmund Jähn — Soyuz 31/29
 Mae Jemison, M.D. — STS-47
 Tamara E. Jernigan — STS-40, STS-52, STS-67, STS-80, STS-96
 Brent W. Jett, Jr. — STS-72, STS-81, STS-97, STS-115
 Jing Haipeng — Shenzhou 7, Shenzhou 9, Shenzhou 11
 Gregory C. Johnson — STS-125
 Gregory H. Johnson — STS-123, STS-134
 Thomas D. Jones — STS-59, STS-68, STS-80, STS-98
 Zenon Jankowski — Soyuz 30 Backup

K
 Leonid Kadeniuk — STS-87
 Alexander Kaleri — Soyuz TM-14, Soyuz TM-24, Soyuz TM-30, Soyuz TMA-3, Soyuz TMA-01M
 Janet L. Kavandi — STS-91, STS-99, STS-104
 James M. Kelly — STS-102, STS-114
 Mark Kelly — STS-108, STS-121, STS-124, STS-134
 Scott Kelly — STS-103, STS-118, Soyuz TMA-01M, Soyuz TMA-16M/18M
 Joseph Kerwin, M.D. — Skylab 2
 Yevgeny Khrunov (1933–2000) — Soyuz 5/4
 Anna Kikina — SpaceX Crew-5
 Jonny Kim — No flights
 Robert S. Kimbrough — STS-126, Soyuz MS-02, SpaceX Crew-2.
 Leonid Kizim (1941–2010) — Soyuz T-3, Soyuz T-10/11, Soyuz T-15
 Petr Klimuk — Soyuz 13, Soyuz 18, Soyuz 30
 Pete Knight — X-15 flight 190
 Pyotr Kolodin — No flights, backup for several missions.
 Vladimir Komarov (1927–1967) † — Voskhod 1. Died during Soyuz 1 reentry crash.
 Yelena Kondakova — Soyuz TM-20/STS-84
 Dmitri Kondratyev — Soyuz TMA-20
 Oleg Kononenko — Soyuz TMA-12, Soyuz TMA-03M, Soyuz MS-11
 Timothy L. Kopra — STS-127/128
 Mikhail Korniyenko — Soyuz TMA-18, Soyuz TMA-16M/18M
 Sergey Korsakov — Soyuz MS-21
 Valery Korzun — Soyuz TM-24, STS-111/113
 Oleg Kotov — Soyuz TMA-10, Soyuz TMA-17, Soyuz TMA-10M
 Vladimir Kovalyonok — Soyuz 25, Soyuz 29/31, Soyuz T-4
 Konstantin Kozeyev — Soyuz TM-33/32
 Kevin Kregel — STS-70, STS-78, STS-87, STS-99
  Sergei Krikalev —  Soyuz TM-7, Soyuz TM-12/Soyuz TM-13, STS-60, STS-88, Soyuz TM-31/STS-102, Soyuz TMA-6
 Valeri Kubasov (1935–2019) — Soyuz 6, Soyuz 19, Soyuz 36/35
 Sergey Kud-Sverchkov — Soyuz MS-17
 André Kuipers — Soyuz TMA-4/3, Soyuz TMA-03M
 Robb Kulin — No flights. Resigned as an astronaut candidate in 2018.

L
 Aleksandr Laveykin — Soyuz TM-2
 Robert Lawrence (1935–1967) — No flights. Trained for MOL program.
 Wendy Lawrence — STS-67, STS-86, STS-91, STS-114
 Vasili Lazarev (1928–1990) — Soyuz 12, Soyuz 18a
 Aleksandr Lazutkin — Soyuz TM-25
 Valentin Lebedev — Soyuz 13, Soyuz T-5/7
 Mark C. Lee — STS-30, STS-47, STS-64, STS-82
 David Leestma — STS-41-G, STS-28, STS-45
 William B. Lenoir (1939–2010) — STS-5
 Alexei Leonov (1934–2019) — Voskhod 2, Soyuz 19. First space walk.
 Frederick W. Leslie — STS-73
 Anatoli Levchenko (1941–1988) — Soyuz TM-4/3
 Byron Lichtenberg — STS-9, STS-45
 Don Lind — STS-51-B
 Kjell N. Lindgren — Soyuz TMA-17M, SpaceX Crew-4 (2022)
 Steven Lindsey — STS-87, STS-95, STS-104, STS-121, STS-133
 Jerry Linenger — STS-64, STS-81/84
 Richard Linnehan — STS-78, STS-90, STS-109, STS-123
 Gregory Linteris — STS-83, STS-94
 Liu Boming — Shenzhou 7, Shenzhou 12
 Liu Wang — Shenzhou 9
 Liu Yang — Shenzhou 9, Shenzhou 14
(Yáng Lìwěi – see Yáng Lìwěi)
 Anthony Llewellyn — No flights
 Paul Lockhart — STS-111, STS-113
 Yuri Lonchakov — STS-100, Soyuz TMA-1/TM-34, Soyuz TMA-13
 Michael Lopez-Alegria — STS-73, STS-92, STS-113, Soyuz TMA-9,  Axiom Mission 1
 Christopher Loria — No flights
 John Lounge — STS-51-I, STS-26, STS-35
 Jack Lousma — Skylab 3, STS-3
 Stanley G. Love — STS-122
 Jim Lovell △ — Gemini 7, Gemini 12, Apollo 8, Apollo 13
 G. David Low (1956–2008) — STS-32, STS-43, STS-57
 Edward Lu — STS-84, STS-106, Soyuz TMA-2
 Shannon Lucid — STS-51-G, STS-34, STS-43, STS-58, STS-76/79.
 Vladimir Lyakhov — Soyuz 32/34, Soyuz T-9, Soyuz TM-6/5

M
 David Mackay — VSS Unity VF-01
 Steven MacLean — STS-52, STS-115
 Sandra Magnus — STS-112, STS-126/119, STS-135
 Oleg Makarov (1933–2003) — Soyuz 12, Soyuz 18a, Soyuz 27/26, Soyuz T-3
 Yuri Malenchenko — Soyuz TM-19, STS-106, Soyuz TMA-2, Soyuz TMA-11, Soyuz TMA-05M, Soyuz TMA-19M
 Franco Malerba — STS-46
 Ravish Malhotra — No flights. India's backup cosmonaut for the Intercosmos program.
 Yuri Malyshev (1941–1999) — Soyuz T-2, Soyuz T-11/10
  Gennadi Manakov —  Soyuz TM-10, Soyuz TM-16
 Musa Manarov — Soyuz TM-4/6, Soyuz TM-11
 Nicole Aunapu Mann — SpaceX Crew-5
 Thomas Marshburn, M.D. — STS-127, Soyuz TMA-07M, SpaceX Crew-3
 Michael Massimino — STS-109, STS-125
 Richard Mastracchio — STS-106, STS-118, STS-131, Soyuz TMA-11M
 Denis Matveev — Soyuz MS-21
 Matthias Maurer — SpaceX Crew-3
 Michael Masucci — VSS Unity VF-01
 Thomas Kenneth "Ken" Mattingly II △ — Apollo 16, STS-4, STS-51-C.
 K. Megan McArthur — STS-125, SpaceX Crew-2
 William S. McArthur — STS-58, STS-74, STS-92, Soyuz TMA-7
 Christa McAuliffe (1948–1986)† — Died in the Challenger liftoff disintegration
 Jon McBride — STS-41-G
 Bruce McCandless II (1937–2017) — STS-41-B, STS-31
 Anne McClain — Soyuz MS-11.
 William C. McCool (1961–2003) † — Died in the Columbia reentry disintegration (STS-107)
 Michael J. McCulley — STS-34
 John B. McKay (1922-1975) — X-15 Flight 150 (awarded posthumously). The Flight 74 accident shortened his life.
 James McDivitt — Gemini 4, Apollo 9
 Donald McMonagle — STS-39, STS-54, STS-66
 Ronald McNair (1950–1986) † — STS-41-B. Died in the Challenger liftoff disintegration (STS-51L).
 Carl Meade — STS-38, STS-50, STS-64
 Jessica Meir — Soyuz MS-15 (Expedition 61/62). A member of the first all-female EVA team.
 Bruce Melnick — STS-41, STS-49
 Pamela Melroy — STS-92, STS-112, STS-120
 Mike Melvill — SpaceShipOne flight 15P and 16P
 Leland D. Melvin — STS-122, STS-129
 Ulf Merbold — STS-9, STS-42, Soyuz TM-20/19
 Ernst Messerschmid — STS-61-A
 Dorothy M. Metcalf-Lindenburger — STS-131
 Curt Michel (1934–2015) — No flights
 Aleksandr Misurkin — Soyuz TMA-08M, Soyuz MS-06,  Soyuz MS-20
 Edgar Mitchell (1930–2016) △▲ — Apollo 14
 Andreas Mogensen — Soyuz TMA-18M, SpaceX Crew-7
 Jasmin Moghbeli — SpaceX Crew-7
 Abdul Ahad Mohmand — Soyuz TM-6/5
 Mamoru Mohri — STS-47, STS-99
 Andrew R. Morgan — Soyuz MS-13
 Barbara Morgan — STS-118
 Lee Morin — STS-110
 Boris Morukov (1950–2015) — STS-106
 Beth Moses — VSS Unity VF-01
 Chiaki Mukai, M.D. — STS-65, STS-95
 Richard Mullane — STS-41-D, STS-27, STS-36
  Talgat Musabayev — Soyuz TM-19, Soyuz TM-27, Soyuz TM-32/31
 Story Musgrave, M.D. — STS-6, STS-51-F, STS-33, STS-44, STS-61, STS-80

N
 Steven R. Nagel (1946–2014) — STS-51-G, STS-61-A, STS-37, STS-55
 George Nelson — STS-41-C, STS-61-C, STS-26
 Grigori Nelyubov (1934–1966) — No flights. Vostok backup.
 Rodolfo Neri Vela — STS-61-B
 Paolo A. Nespoli — STS-120, Soyuz TMA-20
 James H. Newman — STS-51, STS-69, STS-88, STS-109
 Sultan Al Neyadi — SpaceX Crew-6
 Claude Nicollier — STS-46, STS-61, STS-75, STS-103
 Nie Haisheng — Shenzhou 6, Shenzhou 10, Shenzhou 12
 Andriyan Nikolayev (1929–2004) — Vostok 3, Soyuz 9
 Soichi Noguchi — STS-114, Soyuz TMA-17, SpaceX Crew-1
  Carlos I. Noriega — STS-84, STS-97
 Oleg Novitskiy — Soyuz TMA-06M, Soyuz MS-18
 Lisa Nowak — STS-121
 Karen Nyberg — STS-124, Soyuz TMA-09M

O
 Bryan O'Connor — STS-61-B, STS-40
 Ellen Ochoa — STS-56, STS-66, STS-96, STS-110
 Wubbo Ockels (1946–2014) — STS-61-A
 William Oefelein — STS-116
 Loral O'Hara — No flights
 Brian O'Leary — No flights
 John D. Olivas — STS-117, STS-128
 Takuya Onishi — Expedition 48/49.
 Ellison Onizuka (1946–1986) † — STS-51-C. Died in the Challenger liftoff disintegration (STS-51L).
 Yuri Onufrienko — Soyuz TM-23, STS-108/111
 Stephen Oswald — STS-42, STS-56, STS-67
 Aleksey Ovchinin — Soyuz TMA-20M
 Robert Overmyer (1936–1996) — STS-5, STS-51-B

P
 Gennady Padalka — Soyuz TM-28, Soyuz TMA-4, Soyuz TMA-14, Soyuz TMA-04M, Soyuz TMA-16M
 William Pailes — STS-51-J
 Scott Parazynski, M.D. — STS-66, STS-86, STS-95, STS-100, STS-120
 Ronald A. Parise (1951–2008) — STS-35, STS-67
 Robert Parker — STS-9, STS-35
 Luca Parmitano — Soyuz TMA-09M
  Nicholas Patrick — STS-116, STS-130
 Viktor Patsayev (1933–1971) † — Died in the Soyuz 11 reentry depressurisation.
 James Pawelczyk — STS-90
 Julie Payette — STS-96, STS-127
 Gary Payton — STS-51-C
 Timothy Peake — Soyuz TMA-19M
 Philippe Perrin, EAC — STS-111
 Thomas Pesquet — Soyuz MS-03, SpaceX Crew-2
 Donald Peterson — STS-6
 Dmitry Petelin — Soyuz MS-22
 Donald Pettit — STS-113/Soyuz TMA-1, STS-126, Soyuz TMA-03M
 Phạm Tuân — Soyuz 37/36
 John Phillips — STS-100, Soyuz TMA-6, STS-119
 William Pogue (1930–2014) — Skylab 4
 Alan G. Poindexter (1961–2012) — STS-122, STS-131
 Mark Polansky — STS-98, STS-116, STS-127
 Alexander Poleshchuk — Soyuz TM-16
  Valeri Polyakov, M.D. — Soyuz TM-6/7, Soyuz TM-18/20
 Marcos Pontes — Soyuz TMA-8
 Leonid Popov — Soyuz 35/37, Soyuz 40, Soyuz T-7/5
 Pavel Popovich (1930–2009) — Vostok 4, Soyuz 14
 Charles Precourt — STS-55, STS-71, STS-84, STS-91
 Sergey Prokopyev — Soyuz MS-09, Soyuz MS-22
 Dumitru Prunariu — Soyuz 40

R
 Ilan Ramon (1954–2003) — Died in the Columbia reentry disintegration (STS-107)
 William Readdy — STS-42, STS-51, STS-79
 Kenneth Reightler — STS-48, STS-60
 James F. Reilly — STS-89, STS-104, STS-117
 Garrett Reisman — STS-123/124, STS-132
 Thomas Reiter — Soyuz TM-22, STS-121/116 Expedition 13
 Vladimír Remek — Soyuz 28
 Judith Resnik (1949–1986)† — STS-41D. Died in the Challenger liftoff disintegration (STS-51L)
 Sergei Revin — Soyuz TMA-04M
 Paul W. Richards — STS-102
 Richard N. Richards — STS-28, STS-41, STS-50, STS-64
 Sally Ride (1951–2012) — STS-7, STS-41-G. First American woman in space.
 Patricia Robertson, M.D. (1963–2001) — No flights
 Stephen Robinson — STS-85, STS-95, STS-114, STS-130
 Russell L. Rogers (1928–1967) — No flights. Assigned to the Dyna Soar project.
 Roman Romanenko — Soyuz TMA-15 Soyuz TMA-07M
 Yuri Romanenko — Soyuz 26/27, Soyuz 38, Soyuz TM-2/3
 Kent Rominger — STS-73, STS-80, STS-85, STS-96, STS-100
 Stuart Roosa (1933–1994) △ — Apollo 14
 Jerry L. Ross — STS-61-B, STS-27, STS-37, STS-55, STS-74, STS-88, STS-110
 Valery Rozhdestvensky — Soyuz 23
 Kathleen (Kate) Rubins — ISS Expedition 48, Expedition 49, Soyuz MS-17
 Francisco Rubio — Soyuz MS-22
 Nikolay Rukavishnikov (1932–2002) — Soyuz 10, Soyuz 16, Soyuz 33
 Mario Runco, Jr. — STS-44, STS-54, STS-77
 Sergei Ryazanski — Soyuz TMA-10M
  Valery Ryumin (1939–2022) — Soyuz 25, Soyuz 32/34, Soyuz 35/37, STS-91
 Sergey Ryzhikov — Soyuz MS-02, Soyuz MS-17

S
 Albert Sacco — STS-73
 David Saint-Jacques — Soyuz MS-11.
 Aleksandr Samokutyayev — Soyuz TMA-21, Soyuz TMA-14M
 Gennadi Sarafanov (1942–2005) — Soyuz 15
 Robert Satcher, M.D. — STS-129
 Sultan bin Salman bin Abdulaziz Al Saud — STS-51-G
 Viktor Savinykh — Soyuz T-4, Soyuz T-13/14
 Svetlana Savitskaya — Soyuz T-7/5, Soyuz T-12
 Wally Schirra (1923–2007) — Mercury 8, Gemini 6A, Apollo 7
 Hans Schlegel — STS-55, STS-122
 Harrison Schmitt △▲ — Apollo 17
 Rusty Schweickart — Apollo 9
 Dick Scobee (1939–1986) † — STS-41-C. Died in the Challenger liftoff disintegration (STS-51L).
 David Scott △▲ — Gemini 8, Apollo 9, Apollo 15
 Winston Scott — STS-72, STS-87
  Paul Scully-Power — STS-41-G
 Richard Searfoss (1956–2018) — STS-58, STS-76, STS-90
 Rhea Seddon, M.D. — STS-51-D, STS-40, STS-58
 Elliot See (1927–1966) — No flights
 Ronald Sega — STS-60, STS-76
  Piers Sellers (1955–2016) — STS-112, STS-121, STS-132
  Aleksandr Serebrov (1944–2013) — Soyuz T-7/5, Soyuz T-8, Soyuz TM-8, Soyuz TM-17
 Yelena Serova — Soyuz TMA-14M
 Vitali Sevastyanov (1935–2010) — Soyuz 9, Soyuz 18
 Doug Shane — Commercial astronaut, SpaceShipOne 2003
 Yuri Shargin — Soyuz TMA-5/4
  Salizhan Sharipov — STS-89, Soyuz TMA-5
 Rakesh Sharma — Soyuz T-11/10
 Helen Sharman —  Soyuz TM-12, Soyuz TM-11
 Vladimir Shatalov — Soyuz 4, Soyuz 8, Soyuz 10
 Brewster Shaw — STS-9, STS-61-B, STS-28
 Alan Shepard △▲ (1923–1998) — Mercury-Redstone 3, Apollo 14. First American in space.
 William Shepherd — STS-27, STS-41, STS-52, Soyuz TM-31/STS-102
(Nancy Sherlock – see Nancy Currie)
 Anton Shkaplerov — Soyuz TMA-22, Soyuz TMA-15M,  Soyuz MS-19
 Georgi Shonin (1935–1997) — Soyuz 6
 Loren Shriver — STS-51-C, STS-31, STS-46
 Sheikh Muszaphar Shukor, M.D. — Soyuz TMA-11/10
 Peter Siebold — Commercial astronaut, SpaceShipOne 2003
 Oleg Skripochka — Soyuz TMA-01M
 Aleksandr Skvortsov — Soyuz TMA-18, Soyuz TMA-12M
 Donald "Deke" Slayton (1924–1993) — Apollo-Soyuz Test Project
 Michael J. Smith (1945–1986) † — Died in the Challenger liftoff disintegration (STS-51L)
 Steven Smith — STS-68, STS-82, STS-103, STS-110
  Anatoly Solovyev — Soyuz TM-5/4, Soyuz TM-9, Soyuz TM-15, STS-71/Soyuz TM-21, Soyuz TM-26
 Vladimir Solovyov — Soyuz T-10/11, Soyuz T-15
 Sherwood Spring — STS-61-B
 Robert Springer — STS-29, STS-38
 Thomas Patten Stafford △ — Gemini 6A, Gemini 9A, Apollo 10, Apollo-Soyuz Test Project
 Heidemarie Stefanyshyn-Piper — STS-115, STS-126
 Robert Stewart — STS-41-B, STS-51-J
 Susan Still Kilrain — STS-83, STS-94
 Nicole Marie Passonno Stott — STS-128, STS-133
 Krasimir Stoyanov-Soyuz TM-5 — No flights.
  Gennady Strekalov (1940–2004) — Soyuz T-3, Soyuz T-8, Soyuz T-11/10, Soyuz TM-10, Soyuz TM-21/STS-71
 Mark Stucky — VSS Unity VP-03
 Frederick Sturckow — STS-88, STS-105, STS-117, STS-128, VSSUnity VP-03
 Kathryn Sullivan, — STS-41-G, STS-31, STS-45
 Maksim Surayev — Soyuz TMA-16, Soyuz TMA-13M
 Steven Swanson — STS-117, STS-119
 John "Jack" Swigert (1931–1982) △ — Apollo 13

T
 Arnaldo Tamayo Méndez — Soyuz 38
 Daniel Tani — STS-108, STS-120/122
 Joseph Tanner — STS-66, STS-82, STS-97, STS-115
 Evgeny Tarelkin — Soyuz TMA-06M
 James M. Taylor (1930–1970) — No flights. Assigned to MOL project.
 Valentina Tereshkova — Vostok 6. First woman in space.
 Norman Thagard, M.D. — STS-7, STS-51-B, STS-30, STS-42, Soyuz TM-21/STS-71
 Gerhard Thiele — STS-99
 Robert Thirsk, M.D. — STS-78, Soyuz TMA-15
  Andrew Thomas — STS-77, STS-89/91, STS-102, STS-114
 Donald Thomas — STS-65, STS-70, STS-83, STS-94
 Stephen Thorne (1953–1986) — No flights. Died in a stunt plane accident before completing training.
 Kathryn Thornton — STS-33, STS-49, STS-61, STS-73
 William E. Thornton, M.D. — STS-8, STS-51-B
 Pierre Thuot — STS-36, STS-49, STS-62
 Gherman Titov (1935–2000) — Vostok 2
  Vladimir Titov — Soyuz T-8, Soyuz TM-4/6, STS-63, STS-86
 Tang Hongbo — Shenzhou 12
 Michel Tognini, EAC — Soyuz TM-15/14, STS-93
 Valery Tokarev — STS-96, Soyuz TMA-7
 Sergei Treshchov — STS-111/113
 Eugene Trinh — STS-50
 Richard Truly — STS-2, STS-8
  Bjarni Tryggvason — STS-85
 Vasili Tsibliyev — Soyuz TM-17, Soyuz TM-25
 Mikhail Tyurin — STS-105/108, Soyuz TMA-9, Soyuz TMA-11M

U
 Yuri Usachov — Soyuz TM-18, Soyuz TM-23, STS-101, STS-102/STS-105

V
  Lodewijk van den Berg — STS-51-B
 James "Ox" van Hoften — STS-41-C, STS-51-I
 Mark Vande Hei — Soyuz MS-06, Soyuz MS-18,  Soyuz MS-19
 Ivan Vagner — Soyuz MS-16
 Vladimir Vasyutin (1952–2002) — Soyuz T-14
 Charles Veach (1944–1995) — STS-39, STS-52
 Franz Viehböck — Soyuz TM-13/12
  Alexander Viktorenko — Soyuz TM-3/2, Soyuz TM-8, Soyuz TM-14, Soyuz TM-20
 Pavel Vinogradov — Soyuz TM-26, Soyuz TMA-8
 Terry Virts — STS-130, Soyuz TMA-15M
 Roberto Vittori — Soyuz 34/33, Soyuz TMA-6/5, STS-134
 Igor Volk — Soyuz T-12
  Alexander Volkov — Soyuz T-14, Soyuz TM-7, Soyuz TM-13
 Sergey Volkov — Soyuz TMA-12, Soyuz TMA-02M, Soyuz TMA-18M
 Vladislav Volkov (1935–1971) † — Soyuz 7. Died in the Soyuz 11 reentry depressurisation.
 Boris Volynov — Soyuz 5, Soyuz 21
 James Voss — STS-44, STS-53, STS-69, STS-101, STS-102/105
 Janice Voss (1956–2012) — STS-57, STS-63, STS-83, STS-94, STS-99

W
 Koichi Wakata — STS-72, STS-92, STS-119/127, Soyuz TMA-11M, SpaceX Crew-5
 Rex Walheim — STS-110, STS-122, STS-135
 Charles D. Walker — STS-41-D, STS-51-D, STS-61-B
 David M. Walker (1944–2001) — STS-51-A, STS-30, STS-53, STS-69
 Joseph A. Walker (1921–1966) — X-15 flights 77, 90, 91
 Shannon Walker — Soyuz TMA-19, SpaceX Crew-1
 Ulrich Walter — STS-55
 Carl Walz — STS-51, STS-65, STS-79, STS-108/111
 Taylor Wang — STS-51-B
 Wang Yaping — Shenzhou 10, Shenzhou 13
 Jessica Watkins — SpaceX Crew-4 (2022)
 Mary Weber — STS-70, STS-101
 Paul Weitz (1932–2017) — Skylab 2, STS-6
 James Wetherbee — STS-32, STS-52, STS-63, STS-86, STS-102, STS-113
 Douglas Wheelock — STS-120, Soyuz TMA-19
 Ed White (1930–1967) † — Gemini 4. Died in the Apollo 1 fire accident.
 Robert Michael White — X-15 flight 62
 Peggy Whitson — STS-111/113, Soyuz TMA-11
 Terrence Wilcutt — STS-68, STS-79, STS-89, STS-106
 Clifton "C.C." Williams (1932–1967) † — No flights. Died in a plane crash during training.
 Dafydd Williams, M.D. — STS-90, STS-118
 Donald Williams (1942–2016) — STS-51-D, STS-34
 Jeffrey Williams — STS-101, Soyuz TMA-8, Soyuz TMA-16
 Sunita "Suni" Williams — STS-116/117, Soyuz TMA-05M
 Barry Wilmore — STS-129, Soyuz TMA-14M
 Stephanie Wilson — STS-121, STS-120, STS-131
 Gregory R. Wiseman — Soyuz TMA-13M
 Peter Wisoff — STS-57, STS-68, STS-81, STS-92
 David Wolf, M.D. — STS-58, STS-86/89, STS-112, STS-127
 Neil Woodward — No flights
 Alfred Worden (1932–2020) △ — Apollo 15

Y
 Naoko Yamazaki — STS-131
 Yang Liwei — Shenzhou 5
 Ye Guangfu — Shenzhou 13
 Boris Yegorov, M.D. (1937–1994) — Voskhod 1
 Aleksei Yeliseyev — Soyuz 5/4, Soyuz 8, Soyuz 10
 Yi So-yeon  —  Soyuz TMA-12/11
 John Young (1930–2018) △▲ — Gemini 3, Gemini 10, Apollo 10, Apollo 16, STS-1, STS-9
 Kimiya Yui — Soyuz TMA-17M
 Fyodor Yurchikhin — STS-112, Soyuz TMA-10, Soyuz TMA-19, Soyuz TMA-09M

Z
 Sergei Zalyotin — Soyuz TM-30, Soyuz TMA-1/TM-34
 George D. Zamka — STS-120, STS-130
 Zhai Zhigang — Shenzhou 7, Shenzhou 13
 Zhang Lu — Shenzhou 15
 Zhang Xiaoguang — Shenzhou 10
 Vitaliy Zholobov — Soyuz 21
 Vyacheslav Zudov — Soyuz 23

See also

Astronaut fatalities
List of space travelers by nationality
List of Apollo astronauts
List of cosmonauts
List of human spaceflights
List of female astronauts
List of Muslim astronauts
List of United States Marine Corps astronauts
List of Asian American astronauts
List of Hispanic astronauts
List of African-American astronauts
Space Shuttle crews
Spaceflight records
Timeline of space travel by nationality

References

Name
Astronauts
NASA lists